The 1947–48 season was the 47th year of competitive football played by Southampton F.C., the club's 21st season as members of the Football League, and their 19th competing in the Second Division. The Saints finished the campaign in third place in the league table, having gained 52 from a possible 84 points with 21 wins, ten draws and 11 losses. The club also competed in the FA Cup, making it to the sixth round before being eliminated by fellow Second Division side Tottenham Hotspur.

After an underwhelming first post-war league performance the previous season, Southampton manager Bill Dodgin made a number of new signings before the start of the 1947–48 campaign. One of the biggest deals in the summer of 1947 was the sale of winger Don Roper to Arsenal, for whom the First Division side paid £12,000 as well as transferring two of their own forwards – George Curtis and Tommy Rudkin. Also signed in the summer were Luton Town forward Augie Scott, Leyton Orient full-back Ted Ballard, and young Scottish forward George Beattie. Dodgin continued signing new players during the first half of the season, adding winger Billy Wrigglesworth and centre-forward Charlie Wayman in October, followed by Scottish goalkeeper Ian Black in December. All three played central roles in the second half of the season.

During the season, 23 players appeared for Southampton in all competitions. Full-back Alf Ramsey featured in more games than any other player, being ever present in both the league and FA Cup with 46 appearances. Charlie Wayman, who joined the club a few months after the season started, finished as Southampton's top scorer with 19 goals in all competitions – 17 in the league and two in the FA Cup. The club attracted an average home league attendance at The Dell of 20,717 – the highest league attendance was 27,330 against West Bromwich Albion, although this was surpassed in the FA Cup fifth round against Swindon Town which was attended by 29,134.

Second Division

Season summary
Southampton's start to the 1947–48 league campaign brought mixed fortunes. The side won just four of its first ten games, failing to pick up victories over recently promoted sides Doncaster Rovers (with whom they drew 1–1 in the opening fixture) and Cardiff City (by whom they were thrashed 1–5), which left them in the bottom half of the table. The team's performances picked up starting in November after they had signed prolific Newcastle United centre-forward Charlie Wayman, who helped them secure wins against title challengers Birmingham City, as well as mid-table sides Barnsley and Luton Town. In December, the club won three games in a row (including a season-record 6–1 return win over Doncaster) to reach the top five of the league table by Boxing Day. In his first ten games at the Saints, Wayman scored eight times.

With new signing Ian Black taking over in goal, Southampton started the new year on strong form, embarking on an unbeaten run of nine league games between 31 January and 29 March 1948; the run included a 5–1 home win over relegation-threatened Millwall, a 1–0 away win against Coventry City, and a 4–2 victory over eventual Second Division runners-up Newcastle United in which Wayman scored twice in three minutes against his former club. By the end of March, Southampton were in the running for promotion to the First Division, however after two wins in early April against Barnsley and Plymouth Argyle, it was predicted by local newspaper the Southern Daily Echo that the team could "forget about promotion". Four wins from their last five games saw Southampton climb from fifth to third, where they finished just four points behind second.

Final league table

Results by matchday

Match results

FA Cup
Sunderland 
Southampton entered the 1947–48 FA Cup in the third round, hosting First Division strugglers Sunderland – who had previously knocked the Saints out of the competition in 1931, 1932 and 1937 – on 10 January 1948. The first half saw both sides enjoying chances on the opposition's goal, with Sunderland initially dominating possession but frequently being denied by the Saints defence (including goalkeeper Ian Black, who was making his home debut). The game remained goalless at half-time, after which the visiting side returned to piling on the pressure, almost scoring through three successive chances for Eddie Burbanks. Around the hour mark, Charlie Wayman came close to scoring for the home side, but his shot hit the post and rebounded off a defender for a corner. It was this set piece which ultimately led to the only goal of the game, when Southampton's Eric Day scrambled the ball into the Sunderland net for 1–0. Both goalkeepers continued to perform in the closing minutes of the game to deny either side another chance.

Blackburn Rovers 
Another home tie in the fourth round two weeks later saw Southampton hosting Blackburn Rovers who, like Sunderland, were fighting against relegation from the top tier of the Football League. Despite starting well, the Saints went behind after just 11 minutes, when Rovers wing-half Jackie Campbell put the visitors ahead; just a minute later, however, the hosts responded and Eric Day scored an equaliser. Both sides enjoyed a number of chances on goal throughout the rest of the first half, but it was Southampton who made it 2–1 through Charlie Wayman shortly before the break. The home side enjoyed the majority of possession early in the second half, but it was Blackburn who scored next when Charlie McClelland equalised with a close range strike. In the final five minutes, with Southampton on the back foot and a replay looking likely, Day scored his second and the Saints' third of the game to send the Hampshire side through to the fifth round of the FA Cup for the first time since 1927.

Swindon Town 
Southampton's fifth round tie saw them hosting yet again, this time with Third Division South side Swindon Town making the trip to The Dell, bringing "several thousand" fans to contribute to a season-high attendance of 29,134 (with "thousands" more denied entry). Swindon were reduced to ten men after just eight minutes when right-back Harry Kaye injured his ankle; subsequently, Southampton broke the deadlock after 24 minutes when Charlie Wayman scored "one of the most remarkable goals ever seen in football", according to local newspaper the Southern Daily Echo. Just over ten minutes after the half-time break, the hosts doubled their lead through George Curtis, who headed in from an Alf Ramsey free kick. Two minutes later, it was 3–0 through a Jimmy Ithell own goal, caused by an attack by Wayman.

Tottenham Hotspur 
In their first sixth round home tie ever, Southampton hosted Second Division rivals Tottenham Hotspur on 28 February 1948. Both teams enjoyed spells of possession and goal-scoring chances in the first 45 minutes – Spurs almost went ahead through Ernie Jones and Len Duquemin on a number of occasions, while the Saints came close just before the break courtesy of a Ted Bates header which was just pushed onto the post by goalkeeper Ted Ditchburn. The first half ended goalless, before Southampton increased the pressure in the second half with plenty of shots and corners in the Spurs half; George Curtis came closest to scoring, when his low shot was cleared off the line by Tottenham full-back Sid Tickridge. It was the visitors, however, who scored the only goal of the fixture in the 75th minute, when Les Bennett scored a goal from 20 yards with his left foot, despite the assertion that he "couldn't kick a ball with his left foot" according to Southampton centre-half Joe Mallett. Southampton were unable to respond and Tottenham went through.

Post-season friendlies
Following the end of the league campaign, Southampton embarked on a tour of Brazil to play eight friendly matches. The first four fixtures ended in losses: 0–4 at Fluminense, 1–3 at Botafogo (Bill Ellerington scoring the consolation for the visitors), 2–4 at São Paulo (Saints goals scored by Bill Rochford and Charlie Wayman), and 1–2 at Portuguesa (Wayman scoring for Southampton). The travelling Saints won the next two matches, 2–1 against Corinthians with goals from Wilf Grant and George Curtis, and 3–1 against Flamengo thanks to goals from Wayman (twice) and Augie Scott. The last two games of the Brazilian tour were a 1–2 loss at Vasco da Gama and a 1–1 draw with Minas Gerais (Wayman scored in both games).

Squad statistics

Most appearances

Top goalscorers

Transfers

Footnotes

References

Bibliography

Southampton F.C. seasons
Southampton